Breast contouring may refer to:
 making breasts appear more prominent through makeup, see contouring
 medical procedures that reshape breasts, see body contouring